Don Pedro Colley (August 30, 1938 – October 11, 2017) was an American actor. Some of his better known roles include Gideon on Daniel Boone, Ongaro in Beneath the Planet of the Apes, SRT in George Lucas' THX 1138, Joshua in The Legend of Nigger Charley, and Sheriff  Ed Little in the 1980s TV series The Dukes of Hazzard.

Early life
Colley was born in Klamath Falls, Oregon, to Muriel and Pete Colley. He attended Klamath Union High School and actively played football and track and field, which led to an unsuccessful try-out for the 1960 Summer Olympics. He later attended the University of Oregon and studied architecture. Later, he became a theatre member and spent five years learning his craft in various productions in San Francisco.

Career
Colley appeared in several 1960s and '70s television Westerns that included The Wild, Wild West, Cimarron Strip, The Virginian, Nichols, and Iron Horse. He was a guest at the 2012 Memphis Film Festival's "A Gathering of Guns 4: A TV Western Reunion" at the Whispering Woods Hotel and Conference Center in Olive Branch, Mississippi.

During the 1970s Blaxploitation era, Don appeared alongside Fred "The Hammer" Williamson, D'Urville Martin, and Gloria Hendry in such films as Legend of Nigger Charley, Black Caesar, and Sugar Hill.

Throughout his career, Don made several guest appearances in many popular TV series, including Adam 12, Night Gallery, Ironside, The Streets of San Francisco, Harry O, Little House on the Prairie, Starsky and Hutch, The Bionic Woman, Fantasy Island, and The A-Team. However, he is probably best known for his roles of Gideon in the series Daniel Boone, SRT in George Lucas' THX 1138, in Beneath the Planet of the Apes as Ongaro, and as Sheriff Little in the TV series Dukes of Hazzard.

Death
Colley died of cancer in his hometown of Klamath Falls, Oregon, on October 11, 2017, at the age of 79.

Filmography

The Bill Cosby Show(1969 TV series 1x24) - Big Bronson
Daniel Boone (1968–1969, TV series) - Gideon
The Virginian (1968, TV series) - Ira Diller
Here Come the Brides (1968, TV series) - Ox
Beneath the Planet of the Apes (1970) - Ongaro
Believe in Me (1971) - Man
THX 1138 (1971) - SRT
Adam-12 (1971, TV series) - T. Leeland Sabeth 
Crosscurrent (1971, TV movie) - Freddie Trench
The Legend of Nigger Charley (1972) - Joshua
Lapin 360 (1972)
The World's Greatest Athlete (1973) - Morumba 
Black Caesar (1973) - Crawdaddy
This Is a Hijack (1973) - Champ
Sugar Hill (1974) - Baron Samedi
Herbie Rides Again (1974) - Barnstorff
Little House on the Prairie (1977, TV series) - Dr. Tane
Starsky and Hutch (1977, TV series) - Papa Theodore
Space Academy (1977, TV series) - Dramon
Casino (1980, TV movie) - Sam
The Dukes of Hazzard (1981–1984, TV series) - Sheriff Ed Little
The Blue Iguana (1988) - Boat Captain
Journey of Honor (1991) - Narrator (voice)
Quest of the Delta Knights (1993) - Black Spy
Cagney & Lacey: The Return (1994, TV movie) - Virgil
Piranha (1995) - Leonard
A Hollow Place (1998, short) - Office Stern
Midnight Massacre (2016) - President Tarquin

References

Further reading

External links

Don Pedro Colley interview about working on THX 1138
Don Pedro Colley WFMU interview

1938 births
2017 deaths
Male actors from Oregon
American male film actors
American male television actors
American male stage actors
African-American male actors
People from Klamath Falls, Oregon
University of Oregon alumni
20th-century African-American people
21st-century African-American people
African-American history of Oregon